Epicephala acrocarpa is a moth of the family Gracillariidae. It is known from Samoa.

References

Epicephala
Moths described in 1927